Stanisław Karubin (29 October 191512 August 1941) was a Polish fighter ace of the Polish Air Force in World War II with 7 confirmed kills.

Biography
Karubin after graduating from Non-Commissioned Officer's School for minors was assigned to the 111th Fighter Escadrille. On 3 September 1939 he shot down his first plane, a Bf 110. On 23 January 1940 he arrived in France via Romania and Greece. He served in the Krasnodębski section of the Groupe de Chasse et de Défense I/55, on 3 June he downed a Do 17 or a Do 215. After the capitulation of France he came to the UK. He took part in the Battle of Britain in the No. 303 Polish Fighter Squadron and destroyed 5 German aircraft. On 6 September 1940 he was hit and jumped with a parachute. On 18 September he received the Virtuti Militari. He was sent to No. 55 Operational Training Unit RAF. On 12 August 1941, flying in the clouds, Karubin struck a mountainside, at the same way also died another Polish pilot, Zygmunt Höhne.

Aerial victory credits
 Bf 110 - 3 September 1939
 Do 17 or Do-215 - 3 June 1940
 Bf 109 - 31 August 1940 
 2 Bf 109 - 5 September 1940
 He-111 - 6 September 1940 
 Bf 109 - 5 October 1940

Awards
 Virtuti Militari, Silver Cross 
 Cross of Valour (Poland), three times
 Distinguished Flying Medal

References

Further reading
 Olgierd Cumft i Hubert Kazimierz Kujawa, Księga lotników polskich poległych, zmarłych i zaginionych 1939-1946, editor Ministerstwa Obrony Narodowej, Warsaw 1989, wyd. I, p. 316-317.
 Tomasz Demidowicz "Lotnicy Podlasia. Słownik biograficzny", Biała Podlaska 2005, p. 87.
 Arkady Fiedler, Squadron 303.
 .
 Wacław Król, Polskie skrzydła nad Francją, Wydawnictwo "Książka i Wiedza", Warsaw 1986, s. 221-222.
 Tadeusz Jerzy Krzystek, Anna Krzystek: Polskie Siły Powietrzne w Wielkiej Brytanii w latach 1940-1947 łącznie z Pomocniczą Lotniczą Służbą Kobiet (PLSK-WAAF). Sandomierz: Stratus, 2012, s. 264. 
 Jerzy Pawlak, Polskie eskadry w latach 1918-1939, Wydawnictwa Komunikacji i Łączności, Warsaw 1989, .
 Piotr Sikora: Asy polskiego lotnictwa. Warszawa: Oficyna Wydawnicza Alma-Press. 2014, s. 292-293. 
 Józef Zieliński: Asy polskiego lotnictwa. Warszawa: Agencja lotnicza ALTAIR, 1994, s. 44. 
 Józef Zieliński: Lotnicy polscy w Bitwie o Wielką Brytanię. Warszawa: Oficyna Wydawnicza MH, 2005, s. 81-82. 

The Few
Polish World War II flying aces
Recipients of the Silver Cross of the Virtuti Militari
Recipients of the Cross of Valour (Poland)
1941 deaths
1915 births
Royal Air Force personnel killed in World War II
Recipients of the Distinguished Flying Medal